Blackhawks was a monthly series launched by DC Comics in September 2011. The series had no direct ties to previous incarnations of DC's long-running Blackhawk characters. The book is set in the present day with no appearances by or mention of prior Blackhawks, although there is a new "Lady Blackhawk". The book shares the setting of the rebooted DC Universe continuity set up in the Flashpoint mini-series and is a part of DC's New 52 initiative.

The series ended with Blackhawks #8 (April 2012) to make way for a "second wave" of New 52 titles.

References